Jay Woodcroft (born August 11, 1976) is a Canadian former professional ice hockey player who is the head coach of the Edmonton Oilers of the National Hockey League (NHL).

Early life 
Woodcroft was a child actor at an early age, appearing in the 1979 pilot episode of The Littlest Hobo when he was under two years old. He also played Bobby Moore in the 1986 film Separate Vacations.

Coaching career 
In July 2008, the San Jose Sharks hired Woodcroft as an assistant coach under head coach Todd McLellan.
On April 20, 2015, the Sharks announced that they had agreed to "part ways" with head coach Todd McLellan, assistant coaches Jim Johnson and Jay Woodcroft, as well as video coordinator Brett Heimlich. On June 25, 2015, the Edmonton Oilers appointed Jay Woodcroft and Jim Johnson as assistant coaches, rejoining newly appointed head coach Todd McLellan in Edmonton. On April 27, 2018, Woodcroft was appointed the head coach of the Bakersfield Condors, the Oilers' American Hockey League affiliate. Under his guidance, the Condors had a 105–71–21 record during the regular season and captured the Pacific Division playoff championship during the 2020–21 campaign. Bakersfield also captured the Pacific Division regular season title in 2019.

On February 10, 2022, the Oilers announced they fired Dave Tippett from the team, and named Woodcroft as the team's new interim head coach. Following a successful run to the Western Conference Finals, on June 21, 2022, Edmonton signed Woodcroft to a three-year deal to remain as the team's head coach.

Head coaching record

References

External links
 

1976 births
Living people
Alabama–Huntsville Chargers men's ice hockey players
Anchorage Aces players
Canadian ice hockey coaches
Canadian ice hockey centres
Corpus Christi Icerays players
Detroit Red Wings coaches
Edmonton Oilers coaches
Flint Generals players
Jackson Bandits players
Missouri River Otters players
San Jose Sharks coaches
Ice hockey people from Toronto
Bakersfield Condors coaches